Ruth Fletcher was the third Principal of the Eva Rose York Bible Training and Technical School for Women in Tuni.  Ruth was the great granddaughter of A. V. Timpany, one of the pioneer missionaries of the Canadian Baptist Ministries.  Ruth's mother, Dorothy Timpany was a Medical Doctor at the CBM Bethel Hospital, Vuyyuru.

Ruth studied at the Toronto Bible School between 1952-1953  and later pursued graduate studies at the McMaster University which awarded her a B.A.

Some of the correspondence of Ruth Fletcher is kept at Wheaton College, Illinois.

References
Notes

Further reading
 

Canadian Indologists
McMaster University alumni
Canadian Baptist Ministries missionaries in India
Canadian Baptist Ministries